DocAgora was a non-profit international thinktank and open webplex that claimed to stimulate discussion about new forms, new platforms and new ways of financing documentary media.

DocAgora  hosted events at festivals worldwide, including the International Documentary Film Festival Amsterdam, HotDocs, SilverDocs, Sunny Side of the Doc, and the Australian International Documentary Conference.

The DocAgora Webplex was an open database of resources for the documentary community.

As of 2016 it appears to have ceased operations.

References

External links
 DocAgora.org
 indieWIRE.com
 RealTimeArts.net
 Documentary.org
 MediaRights.org

Think tanks based in Canada